Alexander Ferguson (February 23, 1860 – March 3, 1925) was a farmer and politician in Ontario, Canada. He represented Cardwell from 1906 to 1908 and Simcoe South from 1908 to 1919 in the Legislative Assembly of Ontario as a Conservative member.

He was educated in Collingwood. Ferguson was elected to the Ontario assembly by acclamation in a 1906 by-election held after Edward Alfred Little resigned his seat.

He died at Schomberg, Ontario in 1925.

References

External links
 

1860 births
1925 deaths
Progressive Conservative Party of Ontario MPPs